Metal-induced crystallization (MIC) is a method by which amorphous carbon (a-C), amorphous silicon (a-Si), amorphous oxides and amorphous germanium (a-Ge) can be turned into their polycrystalline phases at relatively low temperatures. 

In the technologically important case of Si, a thin film of a-Si is deposited onto a substrate, usually glass, and then capped with a metal, such as aluminium (Aluminum-induced crystallization(AIC)). The structure is then annealed at temperatures between 150 °C and 400 °C which causes the a-Si films to be transformed into polycrystalline silicon.

In a variant of this method, called Metal-induced lateral crystallization (MILC), metal is only deposited on some area of the a-Si. Upon annealing, crystallization starts from the portion of a-Si which is covered by metal and proceeds laterally. Unlike MIC process, where metal contamination in the obtained polysilicon is relatively high, the laterally crystallized silicon in MILC process contains very small amount of metal contamination. The crystallization speed is low, but is adequate for applications such as fabrication of thin film transistors. In this case, metal is deposited on the source/drain area of the transistor and the channel is laterally crystallized.

It has been also shown that applying an electric field increases the speed of lateral crystallization dramatically. Moreover, the crystallization proceeds unidirectionally.

Recently metal-induced crystallization has been coupled with microwave-assisted crystallization lowering the crystallization temperature and time of amorphous titania. By suspending the amorphous powder in a salty solution containing one of various d-block or p-block elements, and microwaving, crystallization can be induced within a few minutes.

References

Semiconductor device fabrication
Inorganic chemistry
Chemical processes
Crystallography